Texas College is a private, historically black Christian Methodist Episcopal college in Tyler, Texas. It is affiliated with the United Negro College Fund. It was founded in 1894 by a group of ministers affiliated with the Christian Methodist Episcopal (CME) Church, a predominantly black denomination which was at the time known as the Colored Methodist Episcopal Church in America. They planned to provide for education of African-American students, who were excluded from the segregated university system of Texas. They planned a full literary, scientific and classical education for theology, normal training of lower school teachers, music, commercial and industrial training, and agricultural and mechanical sciences.

History
On January 9, 1894, Texas College was founded by a group of ministers affiliated with the Christian Methodist Episcopal (CME) Church, a black denomination. They planned a full, co-educational college to serve people in eastern Texas.

On June 12, 1909, the name of the college was changed from Texas College to Phillips University. It was named for Bishop Henry Phillips and his leadership. The name reversal occurred in 1910 at the Third Annual Conference of the church. In May 1912, the college was officially renamed Texas College. The subsequent years of the college were spent with refinements and enhancements of the educational enterprise.

In 1948, the D.R. Glass Library was built and designed by McKissack & McKissack, and it is a NRHP listed building.

The Articles of Incorporation reflect such efforts with modifications and amendments during periods 1909 to 1966. The college today is open to all individuals without discrimination on the grounds of national origin, race, religion, or sex. It is authorized to offer instruction in the areas of Arts and Sciences, Humanities, Natural Sciences, Social Sciences, preparation of teachers, and the provision of instructional supports, to those in pursuit of an education.

Academics
Texas College offers bachelor's degree programs in biology, business administration, criminal justice, computer science, English, interdisciplinary studies (teacher certification), mathematics, music, liberal studies, religion, social work and sociology. Also available are Associate of Arts degrees in early childhood education and general studies, as well as a post-baccalaureate alternative certification teacher education program for people with bachelor's degrees.

Athletics
The Texas College athletic teams are called the Steers. The college is a member of the National Association of Intercollegiate Athletics (NAIA), primarily competing in the Red River Athletic Conference (RRAC) for most of their sports since the 1998–99 academic year; while its football team competes in the Sooner Athletic Conference (SAC). The Steers previously competed as a founding member of the Southwestern Athletic Conference (SWAC) from 1920–21 to 1961–62, which is currently an NCAA Division I FCS athletic conference.

Texas College competes in 12 intercollegiate varsity sports: Men's sports include baseball, basketball, cross country, football, soccer and track & field; while women's sports include basketball, cross country, soccer, softball, track & field and volleyball.

Football
Texas College was a member of the SWAC from 1920 to 1961 (41 years). Texas College was SWAC football champions in 1934, 1935, 1936, 1942 and three-way champions with Wiley College and Langston University in 1944, finishing the season with a conference record of 5–1 and an overall record of 8–1. The last SWAC football victory was against Prairie View A&M University in 2003 by a score of 21 to 10.

Its football team was revived as an official sport in 2004, and competed in the Central States Football League (CSFL). The Texas College football team won two CSFL Conference Co-Championships in 2005 and 2006. In 2018, the Texas College football team joined the SAC as an associate member.

Student life

Residence halls
Texas College constructed a new residence hall, The Living and Learning Center (LLC), that opened in 2016.

Residence halls also include the Daniel and the Maddie A. Fair Residence Hall, which were renovated in 2016 as well.

Greek organizations
Sororities:  Delta Sigma Theta, Zeta Phi Beta, Alpha Kappa Alpha, Sigma Gamma Rho
Fraternities: Alpha Phi Alpha,  Kappa Alpha Psi, Omega Psi Phi, Phi Beta Sigma

Notable alumni

Notable faculty

References

External links

 Official website
 Official athletics website
 

 
Historically black universities and colleges in Texas
Liberal arts colleges in Texas
Private universities and colleges in Texas
Education in Tyler, Texas
Historically black universities and colleges in the United States
Schools in Smith County, Texas
Educational institutions established in 1894
1894 establishments in Texas
Universities and colleges accredited by the Southern Association of Colleges and Schools
Red River Athletic Conference